Oidium is a genus of Deuteromycetes, where traditionally most anamorphs of the order Erysiphales are included. Most of them are plant pathogens causing different forms of powdery mildew, for example:

Oidium alphitoides (= O. quercinum) = Microsphaera alphitoides (on oaks)
Oidium anacardii (= Acrosporium anacardii) (on cashew)
Oidium arachidis (on peanut)
Oidium asteris-punicei (= Erysiphe cichoracearum) (on mangos)
Oidium balsamii = Erysiphe verbasci (on mulleins)
Oidium begoniae (=O.cyclaminis, O.lini, O.violae) = Erysiphe polyphaga (on Valerianella, Calluna and Erica)
Oidium candicans (= Monilia candicans)
Oidium caricae (on papayas)
Oidium caricae-papayae (on papayas)
Oidium caricicola (on papayas)
Oidium chrysanthemi = Erysiphe cichoracearum (on numerous plant species, especially Asteraceae)
Oidium carpini
Oidium chartarum (= Torula chartarum)
Oidium cyparissiae (= Acrosporium cyparissiae) (on cypress)
Oidium erysiphoides = Sphaerotheca fuliginea (on melons, watermelons and cucumbers)
Oidium euonymi-japonicae (on spindle-trees)
Oidium farinosum = Podosphaera leucotricha (on apples)
Oidium fructigenum = Monilia fructigena (on Rosaceae)
Oidium helichrysi (on strawflowers)
Oidium heveae (on rubber tree)
Oidium hortensiae = Microsphaera polonica (on bear's breeches and hydrangea)
Oidium indicum (on papayas and other tropical fruits)
Oidium lauracearum (on laurel)Oidium lini ( = Euoidium lini)(on flax)Oidium lycopersicum (on tomatoes)Oidium mangiferaeOidium manihotisOidium monilioides (=O.tritici)= Blumeria graminis (on cereals)Oidium neolycopersici (on tomatoes)Oidium oxalidis = Microsphaera russellii (on sorrels)Oidium papayae (on papayas)Oidium pullorumOidium sesamiOidium tingitaninumOidium tuckeri = Uncinula necator (on grapes)Oidium albicans has been a parallel name of the yeast Candida albicans (not related to the powdery mildew).

Some other species of medical importance previously classified as  Oidium include:Oidium cutaneum = Trichosporon cutaneum (cause of some human fungal diseases)Oidium lactis (=Oidium pulmoneum) = Geotrichum candidum'' (in soil, water and air, also belongs to normal human flora)

References 

  
Deuteromycota
Fungal plant pathogens and diseases
Erysiphales
Leotiomycetes genera
Taxa named by Johann Heinrich Friedrich Link
Taxa described in 1824